The 2013 Intersport Heilbronn Open was a professional tennis tournament played on hard courts. It was the 25th edition of the tournament which was part of the 2013 ATP Challenger Tour. It took place in Heilbronn, Germany between 23 and 29 January 2013.

Singles main draw entrants

Seeds

 1 Rankings are as of January 14, 2013.

Other entrants
The following players received wildcards into the singles main draw:
  Andreas Beck
  Paul-Henri Mathieu
  Cedrik-Marcel Stebe
  Jan-Lennard Struff

The following players received entry from the qualifying draw:
  Pavol Červenák
  Bastian Knittel
  Dominik Meffert
  Maxime Teixeira

Doubles main-draw entrants

Seeds

 1 Rankings are as of January 14, 2013.

Other entrants
The following pairs received wildcards into the doubles main draw:
  Andreas Beck /  Nils Langer
  Bastian Knittel /  Jan-Lennard Struff
  Dominik Meffert /  Björn Phau

The following pairs received entry as alternates:
  Marius Copil /  Adrian Ungur
  Christian Hirschmüller /  Harry Meehan

Champions

Singles

 Michael Berrer def.  Jan-Lennard Struff, 7–5, 6–3

Doubles

 Johan Brunström /  Raven Klaasen def.  Jordan Kerr /  Andreas Siljeström, 6–3, 0–6, [12–10]

External links
Official Website

Intersport Heilbronn Open
Intersport Heilbronn Open
Intersport Heilbronn Open
2010s in Baden-Württemberg